This is a list of memorials and monuments to the Holodomor and its millions of victims. It includes:

Australia
Memorial in the Ukrainian Orthodox Center, Canberra

Canada
 Memorial in Jackson Park, Windsor, Ontario
 Memorial in Manitoba Legislative Building, Winnipeg, Manitoba
 Monument in Memorial Drive, Calgary, Alberta
 Monument in City Hall, Edmonton, Alberta (first in the world, established in 1983)
 Memorial in Wascana Park, Regina, Saskatchewan
 Memorial in Dormition of the Mother of God Ukrainian Catholic Church, Mississauga, Ontario

Germany
 Monument in Munich, Germany (near the Cathedral of the Intercession of the Mother of God and of St. Andrew)

Ukraine
 "Barrow of Sorrows" monument in Mhar, Poltava Oblast, Ukraine
 Memorial cross in Dnipro, Ukraine
 Memorial cross in Dolotetske, Vinnytsia Oblast, Ukraine
 Memorial cross in Kharkiv, Ukraine
 Memorial in Andrushivka village cemetery, Vinnytsia Oblast, Ukraine
 National Museum "Memorial to Holodomor victims"
 Memorial in Dovhalivka, Vinnytsia Oblast, Ukraine
 Memorial in Poltava Oblast, Ukraine
 Monument in Boryspil, Ukraine, Kyiv Oblast
 Monument in Luhansk, Ukraine
 Monument in Novoaydar, Luhansk Oblast, Ukraine
 Monument to the victims of the Holodomor of 1932-33 in Kyiv, Ukraine
 Monument in Mariupol, Donetsk Oblast, established in 2004, dismantled by Russian occupation forces in October 2022.

Poland 
 Monument in Lublin
 Monument in Warszawa

United Kingdom
 Memorial cross at the Ukrainian Autocephalous Orthodox Church in Acton, London, England
 Monument at Calton Hill, Edinburgh, Scotland

United States
Holodomor Genocide Memorial in Washington, D.C.
 Monument near Chicago, Illinois
Monument in Los Angeles, California, located in Grand Park

Images of Holodomor memorials and monuments

See also
 List of Holocaust memorials and museums
 Bibliography of Ukrainian history

References

History of Ukraine